Behemoth (foaled 2015) is a multiple Group 1 winning Australian bred thoroughbred racehorse.

Background

Behemoth was initially sold at the 2016 Inglis Great Southern Weanling Sale for A$120,000.

At the 2017 Magic Millions National Yearling Sale, Behemoth was purchased by his current owners, Grand Syndicates for just $6,000.

Racing career

2017/18: two-year-old season

Behemoth made his race debut at Balaklava on the 20 June 2018 where he finished in fifth position.  He had one further start as a two-year-old finishing second at Gawler.

2018/19: three-year-old season

On 6 November 2018,  Behemoth won his first race when resuming as a three-year-old at Morphettville.

Three weeks later he was successful again when winning comfortably at Moonee Valley.  During this race, Behemoth was supported in the betting from $5 into a $3.50 favourite.  He sat back in the six-horse field but worked into the race before the turn and sprinted clear to win by a margin of 3.5 lengths. Trainer David Jolly said after the race, “He still doesn't quite know what he's doing yet, that's the great thing about him, there's a lot of upside.”

On 18 May 2019, Behemoth contested his first Group 1 race in The Goodwood at Morphettville. Despite it being only his seventh career start, Behemoth charged home late to run into second place, beaten only by a narrow margin.

2019/20: four-year-old season

On 31 August 2019, Behemoth won the Listed Penny Edition Stakes at Morphettville Parks.

His only other win as a four-year-old was on the 2 May 2020 in the D. C. McKay Stakes at Morphettville.  Although finishing second on race day behind veteran galloper Jungle Edge, some months later Jungle Edge was disqualified from the race after a prohibited substance was found in his system.  Behemoth was promoted to first position.

2020/21: five-year-old season

On 15 August 2020, Behemoth won the Spring Stakes at Morphettville.

Two weeks later on the 29 August 2020, Behemoth started the $3.30 favourite in the Group 1  Memsie Stakes at Caulfield.  Given a positive ride by Craig Williams, Behemoth gave nothing else a chance in recording a dominant one and a half length win over the Queensland Derby winner Mr Quickie.   It was the first Group 1 in 18 years for Behemoth's trainer David Jolly and the 60th for jockey Williams.

Pedigree

References 

Australian racehorses
Racehorses bred in Australia
Racehorses trained in Australia
2015 racehorse births